Chigorodó is a town and municipality in Antioquia Department, Colombia.

Residents
 Jaime Castañeda, cyclist

Climate
Chigorodó  has a tropical rainforest climate (Af) with heavy to very heavy rainfall year-round.

References

Municipalities of Antioquia Department